The Dr. Wijnaendts Francken-prijs is a prize for essays and literary criticism awarded by the Dutch Maatschappij der Nederlandse Letterkunde. It was first awarded biennially, from 1934 to 1985, and after that every three years.

The award is named for Dutch writer and philosopher Cornelis Johannes Wijnaendts Francken.

Laureates
 2021 - Charlotte Van den Broeck, Waagstukken
 2018 - Arjen Mulder, Wat is leven? Queeste van een bioloog
 2015 - Joep Leerssen, Spiegelpaleis Europa
 2012 - Thomas von der Dunk,  Een Hollands heiligdom
 2009 - Arnold Heumakers, De schaduw van de vooruitgang
 2006 - Arianne Baggerman, Rudolf Dekker, Kind van de toekomst. De wondere wereld van Otto van Eck (1780-1798) 
 2003 - Frank Westerman, Ingenieurs van de ziel
 2000 - Remieg Aerts, De letterheren. Liberale cultuur in de negentiende eeuw: het tijdschrift De Gids
 1997 - Hugo Brems, De dichter is een koe
 1994 - Willem Otterspeer, De wiekslag van hun geest
 1991 - Jaap van Heerden, Wees blij dat het leven geen zin heeft
 1988 - Frits van Oostrom, Het woord van eer
 1985 - Carel Peeters, Houdbare illusies
 1983 - Arie van Deursen, Het kopergeld van de Gouden Eeuw
 1981 - Jeroen Brouwers, Kladboek
 1979 - Hendrik Bonger, Leven en werk van Dirk Volckertsz Coornhert
 1977 - Paul Rodenko, essays on De Vijftigers
 1975 - Rob Nieuwenhuys, Oost-Indische spiegel
 1973 - Karel van het Reve, Het geloof der kameraden
 1971 - H.H. Zwager, Waarover spraken zij?
 1969 - H.U. Jessurun d' Oliviera, Vondsten en bevindingen
 1967 - Jan Emmens, Rembrandt en de regels van de kunst
 1965 - C.F.P. Stutterheim, Conflicten en grenzen
 1963 - Jan den Tex, Oldenbarnevelt, deel I en II
 1961 - S. Dresden, De literaire getuige
 1959 - no prize 
 1957 - Clement Bittremieux, De dichter Jan van Nijlen
 1955 - H. van de Waal, Drie eeuwen vaderlandsche geschiedenisuitbeelding 1500-1800
 1953 - H.A. Gomperts, Jagen om te leven
 1951 - Johanna K. Oudendijk, Koningin Victoria
 1949 - Abel Herzberg, Amor fati
 1947 - Jacques Presser, Napoleon
 1943 - A.M.W.J. Hammacher, Amsterdamsche impressionisten en hun kring
 1941 - Simon Vestdijk, Albert Verwey en de Idee
 1939 - M.D. Ozinga, Daniël Marot, de schepper van den Hollandschen Lodewijk XIV-stijl
 1937 - Annie Romein-Verschoor, Vrouwenspiegel
 1935 - Nicolas Japikse, Prins Willem III, stadhouder en koning

External links
Awards of the Maatschappij der Nederlandse Letterkunde

Awards established in 1934
Dutch literary awards
Literary awards honoring writers
1934 establishments in the Netherlands